La Flamengrie may refer to the following places in France:

 La Flamengrie, Aisne, a commune in the department of Aisne
 La Flamengrie, Nord, a commune in the department of Nord